During World War II, the United States Army Air Forces (USAAF) established numerous airfields in Washington for training pilots and aircrews of USAAF fighters and bombers.

Most of these airfields were under the command of Second Air Force or the Army Air Forces Training Command (AAFTC) (A predecessor of the current-day United States Air Force Air Education and Training Command).  However the other USAAF support commands (Air Technical Service Command (ATSC); Air Transport Command (ATC) or Troop Carrier Command) commanded a significant number of airfields in a support roles.

It is still possible to find remnants of these wartime airfields. Many were converted into municipal airports, some were returned to agriculture and several were retained as United States Air Force installations and were front-line bases during the Cold War. Hundreds of the temporary buildings that were used survive today, and are being used for other purposes.

Major airfields
Army Air Force Training Command
 Yakima Air Base, Yakima
 Joint use USAAF/Civil Airport
 Contract Flying School
 Now: Yakima Air Terminal 

Air Transport Command
 Gray Field, AAF, Fort Lewis
 302d Army Air Force Base Unit
 Now:  Gray Army Airfield, active Army Airfield which supports Fort Lewis.

Air Technical Service Command
 Boeing Field, Seattle
 Aircraft delivery facility, Joint use USAAF/Civil Airport

 Moses Lake AAF, Moses Lake
 465th Army Air Force Base Unit
 Was: Moses Lake Air Force Base (1947)
 Was: Larson Air Force Base (1948-1966)
 Now: Grant County International Airport

 Ellensburg AAF, Ellensburg
 Now: Bowers Airport

 Spokane AAF, Spokane
 498th Army Air Force Base Unit
 Was: Spokane Air Force Base (1947-1950)
 Now:  Fairchild Air Force Base

Second Air Force
 Bellingham/Tulip AAF, Bellingham
 Now: Bellingham International Airport
 Ephrata AAF, Ephrata
 355th Army Air Force Base Unit
 Now: Ephrata Municipal Airport
 Geiger/Sunset Field AAF, Spokane
 41st Army Air Force Base Unit
 Now: Spokane International Airport 
 Seven Mile Gunnery Range, Spokane
 Sub-base of Geiger AAF(7 miles NW of Spokane; may have only been a target field.)
 Felts Field, Spokane
 Auxiliary of Geiger AAF
 Joint civil and contract AAF pilot training
 Now: Felts Field Airport 

 McChord Field AAF, Tacoma
 43d Army Air Force Base Unit
 Was: McChord Air Force Base (1947-2010)
 Now:  Joint Base Lewis-McChord
 Olympia AAF, Olympia
 Now: Olympia Airport
 Paine Field AAF, Everett/Paine
 33d Army Air Force Base Unit
 Was: Paine Air Force Base (1951-1968)(Joint use USAF/Civil Airport)
 Now: Paine Field/Snohomish County Airport 
 Port Angeles AAF, Port Angeles, Washington
 Now: William R. Fairchild International Airport
 Port Townsend AAF, Port Hadlock
 Now: Jefferson County International Airport 
 Walla Walla AAF, Walla Walla
 357th Army Air Force Base Unit
 Now: Walla Walla Regional Airport

References
 Maurer, Maurer (1983). Air Force Combat Units Of World War II. Maxwell AFB, Alabama: Office of Air Force History. .
 Ravenstein, Charles A. (1984). Air Force Combat Wings Lineage and Honors Histories 1947-1977. Maxwell AFB, Alabama: Office of Air Force History. .
 Thole, Lou (1999), Forgotten Fields of America : World War II Bases and Training, Then and Now - Vol. 2.  Pictorial Histories Pub . 
 Military Airfields in World War II - Washington airfieldsdatabase.com

 01
World War II
Washington
United States World War II army airfields